Gmina Brenna is a rural gmina (administrative district) in Cieszyn County, Silesian Voivodeship, in southern Poland, in the historical region of Cieszyn Silesia. Its seat is the village of Brenna.

Villages

Gmina Brenna contains villages of Brenna, Górki Małe and Górki Wielkie.

Neighbouring gminas
Gmina Brenna is bordered by the gminas of Skoczów, Jasienica, Jaworze, Bielsko-Biała, Szczyrk, Wisła and Ustroń.

Twin towns – sister cities

Gmina Brenna is twinned with:
 Baiersdorf, Germany
 Fleurbaix, France
 Główczyce, Poland

References

External links
 

Brenna
Cieszyn County
Cieszyn Silesia